The 2013 Prosperita Open was a professional tennis tournament played on clay courts. It was the tenth edition of the tournament which was part of the 2013 ATP Challenger Tour. It took place in Ostrava, Czech Republic between 29 April and 5 May 2013.

Singles main draw entrants

Seeds

 1 Rankings are as of April 22, 2013.

Other entrants
The following players received wildcards into the singles main draw:
  Nicolas Massú
  Tomáš Papík
  Adam Pavlásek
  Lukáš Rosol

The following players received entry from the qualifying draw:
  Miloslav Mečíř Jr.
  Jaroslav Pospíšil
  Franko Škugor
  Peter Torebko

Doubles main draw entrants

Seeds

1 Rankings as of April 22, 2013.

Other entrants
The following pairs received wildcards into the doubles main draw:
  Dominik Kellovský /  David Poljak
  Jaroslav Levinský /  Ivo Minář
  Adam Pavlásek /  Jiří Veselý

The following pairs received entry as an alternate:
  Victor Crivoi /  Jonathan Eysseric
  Adam El-Effendi /  Darren Walsh

Champions

Singles

 Jiří Veselý def.  Steve Darcis, 6–4, 6–4

Doubles

 Steve Darcis /  Olivier Rochus def.  Tomasz Bednarek /  Mateusz Kowalczyk, 7–5, 7–5

External links
Official Website

Prosperita Open
Prosperita Open
Prosperita Open
Prosperita Open
Prosperita Open